Ethanol is a chemical and intoxicant with the formula .
 Ethanol (data page)

Ethanol may also refer to: 
 For ethanol specifically as a drug, see alcohol (drug)
 Ethanol fuel, used to power vehicles